Altaelva is the third-longest river in Troms og Finnmark county, Norway. The river begins in the mountains and lakes in Kautokeino Municipality, near the border with Troms og Finnmark county and Finland, just south of Reisa National Park. The river has carved out Sautso, one of the largest canyons in Europe on its way from the high Finnmarksvidda plateau down to the sea. The villages of Kautokeino and Masi are located along the river, in addition to the town of Alta.

During the 1970s and 1980s, the river was the site of the Alta controversy regarding the construction of a hydroelectric power plant. The Alta power station was eventually built in 1987, creating the lake Virdnejávri on the river.

The river is one of the best salmon rivers in Norway, known for its large-sized salmon. In 2011, 1,082 salmon ( or heavier) were caught on the river.

Name
The Altaelva literally means the "Alta River" in English. The part of the river that is upstream (south) of the Alta dam is also called Kautokeinoelva, meaning the "Kautokeino River", since that part of the river lies in Kautokeino.

References

External links

Rivers of Troms og Finnmark
Alta, Norway
Kautokeino
Rivers of Norway